Hagiwara Station is the name of multiple train stations in Japan.

 Hagiwara Station (Aichi)
 Hagiwara Station (Fukuoka)